The Dunkel System, also known as the Dunkel College Football Index, is a college football rating system developed in 1929 by Richard C. "Dick" Dunkel, Sr. (1906–1975), to determine a national champion.  Dunkel rated college football teams from 1929 until his death in 1975. His ratings are recognized by the National Collegiate Athletic Association (NCAA) in its Football Bowl Subdivision record book. The NCAA describes Dunkel's methodology as a "power index system."  Dunkel described his system an index and claimed that "his difference by scores is scientifically produced."

From the late 1930s through the early 1960s, Dunkel also hosted a weekly radio program called "Dick Dunkel Football Forecasts".  He also issued college basketball forecasts and rankings in conjunction with Converse, starting in the 1940s.

Dunkel died at age 69 in December 1975 at Daytona Beach, Florida.  From 1975 to 2002, Dunkel's son, Dick Dunkel, Jr., continued to issue ratings, but the popularity of the syndicated service declined.  Starting in 2002, the rankings were prepared jointly by Dick Dunkel, Jr., Bob Dunkel, and John Duck, executive producer of the Daytona Beach News Journal.

Dunkel national champions
The following list identifies the college football national champions as selected by the Dunkel System.

† Dunkel's official website gives USC as its 2007 selection, while the 2017 NCAA Football Bowl Subdivision Records book lists Dunkel's selection as LSU.

See also
NCAA Division I FBS national football championship

References

External links
 

College football championships
College football awards organizations